A silver fern flag is any flag design that incorporates a silver fern, and is usually a white silver fern on a black background. The silver fern motif is associated with New Zealand, and a silver fern flag may be used as an unofficial flag of New Zealand, to which it is endemic. The silver fern itself is a quasi-national emblem, being used for various official symbols, including the coat of arms of New Zealand and the New Zealand one dollar coin. A number of New Zealand sports teams, such as the cricket team, the Silver Ferns and the All Blacks, use similar silver fern flags as part of their official merchandise.  The All Whites association football team use a white background and a black version of the fern.

1980 Moscow Summer Olympics
New Zealand officially boycotted the 1980 Moscow Olympics as part of the US-led boycott of the games. However, four New Zealand athletes competed under the flag of New Zealand's Olympic committee, which was a black flag with a white silver fern imposed over the Olympic Rings.

National flag proposals
The first suggestion that a silver fern flag be adopted as New Zealand's official flag came in 1998 from Cultural Affairs Minister Marie Hasler of the National Party. Hasler's proposal was backed by then Prime Minister Jenny Shipley. Along with the New Zealand Tourism Board, Shipley backed a white silver fern on a black background as a possible alternative flag, along the lines of the Canadian Maple Leaf flag.

In 2003, New Zealand's America's Cup team, Team New Zealand, launched the "Loyal" campaign, using a silver fern flag and a song of the same name by New Zealand musician Dave Dobbyn.

Whilst the All Blacks version of the silver fern flag was once favoured by New Zealand Prime Minister John Key, opponents of the design believe it gives undue emphasis to the country's sport or resembles a pirate flag or the Islamic Black Standard as used by ISIL.

2005 referendum proposal
In January 2005 the NZ Flag.com Trust, using a stylised silver fern flag designed by Cameron Sanders, launched a petition to initiate a referendum on the flag issue, but failed to attract enough signatures.

2015–2016 referendums

On 11 March 2014, the Prime Minister of New Zealand, John Key, announced a referendum on whether to change the New Zealand flag or not, to be held within three years, saying that he liked the silver fern as an option. Of the 10,292 design submissions, approximately 3,113 incorporated elements of a fern, 12 designs of 40 were selected for the long list, and 3 flag designs to the shortlist alternatives have a silver fern.

Service flags proposed by Kyle Lockwood for New Zealand 
This gallery presents the service flags proposed by Kyle Lockwood for New Zealand following the Silver Fern Design.

Gallery

See also
 List of New Zealand flags
 New Zealand flag debate

References

External links 
 Silver Fern flag - Kyle Lockwood's design

Flags of New Zealand
Unofficial flags
Proposed flags of New Zealand
Flags introduced in 1980